Selasphorus is a genus of hummingbirds from Middle and North America.

Taxonomy
The genus Selasphorus was introduced in 1832 by the English naturalist William John Swainson to accommodate the rufous hummingbird which is now the type species. The name combines the Ancient Greek selas meaning "light" or "flame" with -phoros meaning "-carrying".

The genus contains the following nine species:

The wine-throated hummingbird and the bumblebee hummingbird were formerly placed in the genus Atthis. Molecular phylogenetic studies published in 2014 and 2017 found that Atthis was embedded within Selasphorus. The genera were therefore merged and these hummingbirds were moved to Selasphorus.

References

External links 

 
Bird genera
Taxa named by William John Swainson